Team Finland represents Finland in women's international roller derby, in events such as the Roller Derby World Cup.  The team was first formed to compete at the 2011 Roller Derby World Cup, and finished the tournament in fifth place.

Finland's first bout was on 8 October 2011, against Team Sweden in Helsinki, in what Stockholm Roller Derby claimed was "the world's first Roller Derby bout between two nations".  Finland lost by 135 points to 71.

At the World Cup, Finland lost their quarter final to Team Canada by 499 points to 31, at that time the highest point spread in the tournament.  They then beat France and Sweden in the consolation stage, to finish in fifth place.

Team roster

2011 team roster
The team announced its roster for the 2011 Roller Derby World Cup in August 2011.
(league affiliations listed as of at the time of the announcement)

2011 coaching staff
Claire Leah Threat (manager)
Estrogreena Davis (head coach)
Tigre Force (assistant coach)

References

Finland
Roller derby
Roller derby in Finland
2011 establishments in Finland
Sports clubs established in 2011